McPherson High School is a public high school for grades 9–12 in McPherson, Kansas, United States.  It is operated by McPherson USD 418 school district.  Each grade has an average of 200 to 300 students.

Notable alumni
Brad Underwood (Class of 1982) head coach of Illinois men's basketball team.
Steve Henson (Class of 1986) former NBA basketball player and current head coach of University of Texas at San Antonio.
Jonathan Coachman (Class of 1990) former WWE commentator and ESPN broadcaster.
Marlies Gipson (Class of 2005) former WNBA basketball player.*V. John Krehbiel, Ambassador to Finland
Tanner Hawkinson (Class of 2008) retired NFL player

References

External links
 McPherson High School

Public high schools in Kansas
Schools in McPherson County, Kansas